Olga Lazarenko (born 7 January 1980) is a Russian freestyle skier. She competed in the women's moguls event at the 2002 Winter Olympics.

References

1980 births
Living people
Russian female freestyle skiers
Olympic freestyle skiers of Russia
Freestyle skiers at the 2002 Winter Olympics
Place of birth missing (living people)